Rosella Ayane (born 16 March 1996) is a professional footballer who plays as a forward for Tottenham Hotspur. Internationally, Ayane represented England at under-17 and under-19 level before being capped at senior level by Morocco.

Early life
Born in Reading to a Moroccan father and a Scottish mother, Ayane attended Maiden Erlegh School.

Club career

Chelsea
Ayane started her career with Chelsea after coming through the club's Centre of Excellence. She began in the youth system, in 2012 she was a part of the Chelsea U17 that won the league and cup double. She made her first-team debut in August 2013 against Doncaster Rovers Belles; Chelsea won. Three more appearances followed against Everton, Bristol City and Notts County before Ayane was selected as part of Chelsea's squad for the 2013 International Women's Club Championship, she played twice as Chelsea finished second. On 30 August, Ayane scored four goals against London Bees in the FA WSL Cup in an 8–0 victory.

Loan spells
After making four appearances in all competitions for Chelsea in 2014, Ayane was loaned out in 2015 to Millwall; a team she scored twice against for Chelsea in 2015 in the FA WSL Cup. After a few months with Millwall, she returned to her parent club. 2016 saw a loan move to Bristol City, with whom she made nine appearances and scored three goals in all competitions before returning to Chelsea after Bristol manager Willie Kirk decided against extending her loan. A few weeks after leaving Bristol, she was loaned out as Everton became her fourth career club. She scored her first Everton goal on 17 July in a 3–0 win over Yeovil Town.

Apollon Limassol
In August 2017, Ayane joined Cypriot First Division side Apollon Limassol. She scored on her debut for the club, getting the opening goal in a 4–0 home win in the first match of Group 5 in the 2017–18 UEFA Women's Champions League qualifying round against NSA Sofia. On the second matchday, versus Noroc Nimoreni of Moldova, she scored a hat-trick in a 5–0 victory. Ayane followed that up with a goal in the final qualifying group match against Sturm Graz to help advance Apollon into the knockout phase. She netted on her league debut for Apollon on 5 November, scoring the opening goal in a 16–0 win over Champions Ypsona.

In total, she scored nineteen goals in nineteen games in all competitions in her debut season. In April 2018, she was voted into the Players' Team of the Season.

Bristol City
On 18 August 2018, Ayane completed a move to rejoin former loan club Bristol City. One goal in eighteen appearances followed across 2018–19.

Tottenham Hotspur
In July 2019, Ayane moved across the FA WSL to newly promoted Tottenham Hotspur. Her first appearance for Tottenham was against Everton as a substitute on 13 September 2020 and her first goal came in a game against Aston Villa on 13 December 2020.

International career
Ayane has played for England at Under-17 and Under-19 level. Between 2011 and 2012 she won seven caps and scored one goal (vs. Finland, in a 2012 UEFA Women's Under-17 Championship qualifier). In 2014, Ayane made her debut for the England U19s and scored the second goal in a 2–0 win. A year later she scored her second goal for England U19s in a 2–2 draw against Norway in a 2015 UEFA Women's Under-19 Championship qualifier, a match that was replayed in extraordinary circumstances after a refereeing error. In total, Ayane made 17 appearances and scored 3 goals for the U17s and U19s respectively.

Due to her Moroccan father, she was eligible to represent Morocco and made her debut in June 2021, scoring within a minute of entering the field in a 3–0 victory over Mali. Previously, she almost chose Scotland, partly due to her mother's wish for her to become a member of the Scottish squad.

Ayane took part in the 2022 Women's African Cup of Nation held in Morocco. She started in all six matches and scored two goals, including one in the final. Morocco finished second as they were defeated 2–1 in the final against South Africa.

Career statistics

Club
.

International

International goals
Scores and results list Morocco's's goal tally first, score column indicates score after each Ayane goal.

Honours
Chelsea
 FA WSL 1: 2015
 FA Women's Cup: 2014–15
Morocco

 Africa Cup of Nations runner-up: 2022

See also
List of Morocco women's international footballers

References

External links
Rosella Ayane profile on Chelsea's website

1996 births
Living people
Citizens of Morocco through descent
Moroccan women's footballers
Women's association football forwards
Apollon Ladies F.C. players
Morocco women's international footballers
Moroccan expatriate footballers
Moroccan expatriate sportspeople in Cyprus
Expatriate women's footballers in Cyprus
Moroccan people of Scottish descent
Sportspeople from Reading, Berkshire
Footballers from Berkshire
English women's footballers
Chelsea F.C. Women players
Millwall Lionesses L.F.C. players
Bristol City W.F.C. players
Everton F.C. (women) players
Tottenham Hotspur F.C. Women players
Women's Super League players
England women's youth international footballers
English expatriate women's footballers
English expatriate sportspeople in Cyprus
English people of Moroccan descent
English sportspeople of African descent
English people of Scottish descent